Bryon Anthony McCane II (born September 12, 1976), better known by his stage name Bizzy Bone, is an American rapper, singer and the youngest member of the Cleveland rap group Bone Thugs-n-Harmony.

Early life 
Bryon Anthony McCane II was born in Columbus, Ohio. In 1980, 4-year-old Bryon and his two sisters were abducted by their mother’s boyfriend while their mother was at work and held captive for over 2 years. Bryon recalls that at first, he did not know he had been kidnapped and was made to believe that his mother and grandmother were dead. During the time they were abducted, he and his sisters lived in many homes, apartments, cars, and motels, all in northern Oklahoma. He and his sisters were often beaten, tortured, and sexually assaulted. In 1983, the "family" had been living on the Kaw Indian Reservation in Kaw, Oklahoma, for about a year and a half. A babysitter saw his photo at the end of the made-for-TV film Adam about the producer and creator of America's Most Wanted, John Walsh's son's abduction and murder, and called the police, resulting in his and his sisters return to their family.

When he was 13, Bryon began living with his oldest sister at her home near Cleveland, Ohio. During this period, he met Layzie Bone, Krayzie Bone, Wish Bone and Flesh-n-Bone. Bizzy Bone started in hip-hop as a founding member of the group Bone Enterpri$e, which was formed in 1992. The group was noticed by one of the founders of the rap group N.W.A, Eazy-E, who modified the group's name to Bone-Thugs-n-Harmony.

In 2002, McCane appeared on the FOX series America's Most Wanted (hosted by John Walsh, Adam's father)  and he revealed his abusive childhood and molestation. Bryon also wrote and performed a song, "A.M.W.", on the show in which he thanks Walsh and encourages abused children to come forward.

See also
List of kidnappings
List of solved missing person cases

Discography

Solo albums
Heaven'z Movie (1998)
The Gift (2001)
Alpha and Omega (2004)
The Beginning and the End (2004)
Speaking in Tongues (2005)
The Story (2006)
Thugs Revenge (2006)
The Midwest Cowboy (2006)
Trials and Tribulations (2007)
Ruthless (2008)
A Song for You (2008)
Crossroads: 2010 (2010)
The Wonder Years (2014)
Carbon Monoxide (2019)
The Mantra (2020)
War of Roses (2021)
I'm Busy (2022)

Filmography
 Cutthroat Alley (2003) .... Ghetty
 Jacked Up (2001) .... Zach
 Beef III DVD (2006) .... himself
 What Now (2015) .... B Murda

References

External links

1976 births
1980s missing person cases
21st-century African-American musicians
20th-century African-American people
21st-century American male musicians
21st-century American rappers
African-American Christians
African-American male rappers
American hip hop singers
American male rappers
Bone Thugs-n-Harmony members
Formerly missing people
Gangsta rappers
Horrorcore artists
Kidnapped American children
Living people
Missing person cases in Ohio
Rappers from Cleveland
Rappers from Columbus, Ohio